Manlio Busoni (1906–1999) was an Italian film and television actor. He was also a voice actor, dubbing the performances of other actors.

Selected filmography
 Roma città libera (1946)
 The White Primrose (1947)
 The Street Has Many Dreams (1948)
 Against the Law (1950)
 In Olden Days (1952)
 I, Hamlet (1952)
 Too Bad She's Bad (1955)
 Adorabili e bugiarde (1958)
 Le inchieste del commissario Maigret (1964, TV series)
 The Battle of El Alamein (1969)
 The Assassination of Matteotti (1973)

References

Bibliography
 Chiti, Roberto & Poppi, Roberto. Dizionario del cinema italiano: Dal 1945 al 1959. Gremese Editore, 1991.

External links

1906 births
1999 deaths
Italian male voice actors
Italian male film actors
Italian male television actors
People from Lazio